Baker's Holiday is an album of songs associated with Billie Holiday by trumpeter/vocalist Chet Baker which was recorded in 1965 and released on the Limelight label.

Reception 

The Allmusic review by Scott Yanow states: "His performance of ten songs associated with Lady Day (most of which he had not recorded previously) is often exquisite".

Track listing 
 "Trav'lin' Light" (Trummy Young, Jimmy Mundy, Johnny Mercer) – 3:10
 "Easy Living" (Ralph Rainger, Leo Robin) – 3:21
 "That Ole Devil Called Love" (Allan Roberts, Doris Fisher) – 3:15
 "You're My Thrill" (Jay Gorney, Sidney Clare) – 2:58
 "Crazy She Calls Me" (Carl Sigman, Bob Russell) – 3:21
 "When Your Lover Has Gone" (Einar Aaron Swan) – 2:52
 "Mean to Me" (Fred E. Ahlert, Roy Turk) – 3:35
 "These Foolish Things" (Jack Strachey, Holt Marvell, Harry Link) – 3:29
 "There Is No Greater Love" (Isham Jones, Marty Symes) – 2:32
 "Don't Explain" (Arthur Herzog Jr., Billie Holiday) – 3:30

Personnel 
Chet Baker – flugelhorn, vocals on 1,2,6, 8, and 9
Leon Cohen, Henry Freeman, Wilford Holcombe, Seldon Powell, Alan Ross – reeds
Hank Jones –  piano
Everett Barksdale – guitar
Richard Davis – bass 
Connie Kay – drums
Jimmy Mundy – arranger

References 

Chet Baker albums
1965 albums
Limelight Records albums
Billie Holiday tribute albums
Albums arranged by Jimmy Mundy